The Gessertshausen–Türkheim railway (also known as the Staudenbahn—Stauden Railway) is a railway line through the Stauden (hence the name), the southern part of the Augsburg-Westerwald Nature Park (in the districts of Augsburg and Unterallgäu, Bavaria, Germany). One section (Ettringen – Markt Wald) was closed in 1983 because of low passenger numbers and the poor state of the track. The line from Türkheim to Ettringen is used by the Lang Papier factory. The section from Markt Wald to Gessertshausen is only used by an excursion train association. Every second Sunday a diesel fuel train runs from Augsburg Hbf to Markt Wald.

Future 
With the discussion about the suburban railway Augsburg there is a railway line planned to the planned station Langenneufnach Süd. Furthermore, the passenger traffic from Augsburg to Bad Wörishofen should be recommissioned.

References 

 Article Staudenbahn from the German Wikipedia

External links 
 Firmengruppe Staudenbahn
 Erholungslandschaft Stauden

Railway lines in Bavaria
Augsburg (district)
Unterallgäu
Railway lines opened in 1912
Railway lines closed in 1983
1912 establishments in Germany